The El Paso Metropolitan Statistical Area, as defined by the United States Census Bureau, is an area consisting of two counties – El Paso and (since 2013) Hudspeth – in far West Texas, anchored by the city of El Paso.  As of the 2020 United States Census, the MSA had a population of 868,859.  The El Paso MSA forms part of the larger El Paso–Las Cruces combined statistical area, with a total population of 1,088,420 as of the 2020 United States Census.

Counties
El Paso
Hudspeth

Communities

Incorporated places
Town of Anthony
Town of Clint
Dell City
City of El Paso
City of Horizon City
City of Socorro
Village of Vinton

Census-designated places
Note: All census-designated places are unincorporated.

Unincorporated places
Allamoore
Montana Vista
Newman
Salt Flat

See also
El Paso–Juárez, the binational metropolitan area of which this area forms a part
Texas census statistical areas

References

Metropolitan areas of Texas
Geography of El Paso County, Texas